Victor Alexandre Puiseux (16 April 1820 – 9 September 1883) was a French mathematician and astronomer.  Puiseux series are named after him, as is in part the Bertrand–Diquet–Puiseux theorem. His work on algebraic functions and uniformization makes him a direct precursor of Bernhard Riemann, for what concerns the latter's work on this subject and his introduction of Riemann surfaces. He was also an accomplished amateur mountaineer. A peak in the French alps, which he climbed in 1848, is named after him.

A species of Israeli gecko, Ptyodactylus puiseuxi, is named in his honor.

Life
He was born in 1820 in Argenteuil, Val-d'Oise. He occupied the chair of celestial mechanics at the Sorbonne. Excelling in mathematical analysis, he introduced new methods in his account of algebraic functions, and by his contributions to celestial mechanics advanced knowledge in that direction. In 1871, he was unanimously elected to the French Academy.

One of his sons, Pierre Henri Puiseux, was a famous astronomer.

He died in 1883 in Frontenay, France.

References

 

1820 births
1883 deaths
People from Argenteuil
French Roman Catholics
19th-century French mathematicians
École Normale Supérieure alumni
Academic staff of the University of Paris
Members of the French Academy of Sciences